Pignan (Mandarin: 平通羌族乡) is a township in Pingwu County, Mianyang, Sichuan, China. In 2010, Pingnan Township had a total population of 11,819: 5,126 males and 4,694 females: 1,484 aged under 14, 7,372 aged between 15 and 65 and 964 aged over 65.

References 
 

 

 
Township-level divisions of Sichuan
Pingwu County
Ethnic townships of the People's Republic of China